Aminobacterium is a Gram-negative genus of bacteria from the family of Synergistaceae.

Phylogeny

See also
 List of bacterial orders
 List of bacteria genera

References

Synergistota
Bacteria genera